Adrien Sala is a Canadian politician, who was elected to the Legislative Assembly of Manitoba in the 2019 Manitoba general election. He represents the electoral district of St. James as a member of the New Democratic Party of Manitoba.

Sala is also a songwriter who released two solo albums, High Water Everywhere (2006) and Diamond in the Mind (2009). Sala also recorded two albums with Winnipeg folk group Jackpine, Brand New Good Old Days (2009) and Cabbage (2010).

References

New Democratic Party of Manitoba MLAs
Politicians from Winnipeg
Living people
21st-century Canadian politicians
Year of birth missing (living people)